B'in Music, otherwise known as Believe in Music International Limited in full or B'in Music, is a Taiwan-based recording company, formally established on July 1, 2006, and founded by Ason Chen in Taipei.

Current artist roster

B’in Music

iBeams

See also
List of record labels

References

External links
 
 

 

Record labels established in 2006
Taiwanese record labels
Taiwanese companies established in 2006